This Great Black Night is a 1998 EP by Weeping Tile.

It was recorded following the band's departure from Warner Music Canada. It was sold only at live shows; the band toured that year as a supporting act for Ani DiFranco.

The EP sold out, and is now considered a collector's item. However, three of the EP's five tracks were later rerecorded by Sarah Harmer on her 2000 solo album You Were Here, and another was rerecorded for her 2005 album I'm A Mountain.

Track listing
All songs written by Sarah Harmer.

"Weakened State"
"Lodestar"
"Odessa Nights"
"Coffee Stain"
"I'm A Mountain"

Weeping Tile (band) albums
1998 EPs